Peter Hynes may refer to:

 Peter Hynes (footballer) (born 1983), Irish footballer
 Peter Hynes (rugby union) (born 1982), Australian rugby union player

See also
 Peter Hines (born 1948), Australian rules footballer
 Peter F. Hines (1927–1984), American attorney and politician